The 2012 Mid-American Conference men's soccer tournament was the 20th edition of the four-team tournament.  The tournament decided the Mid-American Conference champion and guaranteed representative into the 2012 NCAA Division I Men's Soccer Championship. The tournament was held from November 9–11, 2012 with the higher seed hosting each match.

Qualification

Bracket

Schedule

Semifinals

Championship

Statistical leaders

See also 
 Mid-American Conference Men's Soccer Tournament
 2012 Mid-American Conference men's soccer season
 2012 NCAA Division I men's soccer season
 2012 NCAA Division I Men's Soccer Championship

References 

Mid-American Conference men's soccer seasons